Kamila Špráchalová (sometimes Kamila Špráchal) (born 5 September 1971, Prague) is a Czech stage and television actress. She provides the dubbed voiceover for Angela Watson from the Czech version of Step By Step, and also provides dubbed voiceovers for Jodie Foster and Nicole Kidman. She studied at the Prague Conservatory.

Theatre

ABC Theatre
Dobře rozehraná partie - New housekeeper
Perfect Wedding - Julie
České Vánoce - Manča
U nás v Kocourkově - Lily
Charley's Aunt - Kitty Verdun
Le baruffe chiozzotte - Libera
Arthurovo Bolero - Monika
The Importance of Being Earnest - Cecilia
Manon Lescaut

Other theaters 
Nora -> Divadlo Na Vinohradech (Vinohrady Theatre)
Kdyby tisíc klarinetů (1991) -> from Conservatory
Nuns -> musical

Filmography 
Láska za milion (2009)
Chlipník (2002) (TV)
Nevěsta s velkýma nohama (2002) (TV)
Ptačí král (1997) (TV)
"Draculův švagr" (1996) TV series
O třech stříbrných hřebenech (1991) (TV)
Lhát se nemá, princezno (1991) (TV)
Třináctery hodiny (1991) (TV)
Černovláska (1988) (TV)
Nanečisto (1988) (TV)

TV episodes
"Drákulův švagr" (1996), playing Mr. Teacher's girlfriend in the episode, "Doktor Damián", 1996

Personal life
She is married with two sons, Kryštof and František Kvido.

References

External links 
City Theatres, Prague
Kamila Špráchalová: Tajemství (nejen) hlasu (televize.cz) 
Kamila Špráchalová: Biography and filmography on family genealogy site 

1971 births
Living people
Czech stage actresses
Czech television actresses
Czech voice actresses
Actresses from Prague
20th-century Czech actresses
21st-century Czech actresses
Prague Conservatory alumni